Malsaidi may refer to:
 Malsaidi-ye Olya
 Malsaidi-ye Sofla